Eddie Teo Chan Seng  is a Singaporean civil servant who has been serving as Chairman of the Council of Presidential Advisers since 2019.

Education
A President's Scholar, Teo graduated from the University of Oxford in 1970 with a Bachelor of Arts degree in philosophy, politics and economics (PPE).

He subsequently went to complete a Master of Science degree in international relations at the London School of Economics in 1974.

Career
Teo joined the Security and Intelligence Division (SID) in 1970, before becoming Director in 1979, a post he served until 1994. From 1982 to 1986, he held the position of Director of the Internal Security Department concurrently.

He was Permanent Secretary for Defence from 1994 to 2000 and Permanent Secretary in the Prime Minister’s Office from 1998 to 2005. He was Singapore's High Commissioner to Australia from 2006 to 2008.

He served as Chairman of the Public Service Commission from 2008 to 2018, Chairman of the Presidential Council for Religious Harmony from 2017 to 2019 and Senior Advisor of Temasek International Advisors Pte Ltd from 2019 to 2020.

Teo was appointed as Chairman of the Council of Presidential Advisors on 2 January 2019.

Awards
Teo retired in 2005, after 35 years of public service. For his contributions to the Singapore Public Service, Teo was awarded the Public Administration Medal (Gold) in 1983, the Meritorious Service Medal in 1997, the Distinguished Service Order in 2006 and the Order of Nila Utama in 2017.

References

Living people
Singaporean people of Chinese descent
Singaporean civil servants
Permanent secretaries of Singapore
Saint Andrew's School, Singapore alumni
Recipients of the Darjah Utama Nila Utama
Recipients of the Darjah Utama Bakti Cemerlang
Recipients of the Pingat Pentadbiran Awam
1947 births